Jonny O'Mara (born 2 March 1995) is a British tennis player. He has a career high ATP doubles ranking of 44 achieved on 20 May 2019. He also has a career high ATP singles ranking of World No. 489 achieved on 10 April 2017.

Career

O'Mara won the Master'U BNP Paribas, the world event of university tennis, with Great-Britain in December 2017. He made his ATP main draw debut at the 2017 Aegon International Eastbourne in the doubles draw partnering Scott Clayton.

O'Mara made his Grand Slam debut at the 2017 Wimbledon Championships after receiving a wildcard to the doubles main draw with Clayton.

In June 2018, he claimed his maiden ATP Tour title with his partner Luke Bambridge in the men's doubles final at Valley International in Eastbourne.

At the 2021 Sofia Open he won his third ATP 250 title partnering Ken Skupski.

Doubles performance timeline

Current through the 2022 European Open.

ATP career finals

Doubles: 7 (3 titles, 4 runner-ups)

ATP Challenger and ITF Futures finals

Singles: 3 (1–2)

Doubles: 39 (24–15)

World TeamTennis

O'Mara enters his second season with World TeamTennis in 2020, after making his debut with the San Diego Aviators in 2019. It was announced he will be joining the San Diego Aviators during the 2020 WTT season set to begin July 12.

References

External links
 
 

1995 births
Living people
Sportspeople from Keighley
People from Arbroath
English male tennis players
British male tennis players
Scottish male tennis players
Tennis people from West Yorkshire
Sportspeople from Angus, Scotland